In mathematics, a Hilbert manifold is a manifold modeled on Hilbert spaces. Thus it is a separable Hausdorff space in which each point has a neighbourhood homeomorphic to an infinite dimensional Hilbert space. The concept of a Hilbert manifold provides a possibility of extending the theory of manifolds to infinite-dimensional setting. Analogously to the finite-dimensional situation, one can define a differentiable Hilbert manifold by considering a maximal atlas in which the transition maps are differentiable.

Properties 

Many basic constructions of the manifold theory, such as the tangent space of a manifold and a tubular neighbourhood of a submanifold (of finite codimension) carry over from the finite dimensional situation to the Hilbert setting with little change. However, in statements involving maps between manifolds, one often has to restrict consideration to Fredholm maps, that is, maps whose differential at every point is Fredholm. The reason for this is that Sard's lemma holds for Fredholm maps, but not in general. Notwithstanding this difference, Hilbert manifolds have several very nice properties.

In particular, every Hilbert manifold is parallelizable.
 Every smooth Hilbert manifold can be smoothly embedded onto an open subset of the model Hilbert space. 
 Every homotopy equivalence between two Hilbert manifolds is homotopic to a diffeomorphism. In particular every two homotopy equivalent Hilbert manifolds are already diffeomorphic. This stands in contrast to lens spaces and exotic spheres, which demonstrate that in the finite-dimensional situation, homotopy equivalence, homeomorphism, and diffeomorphism of manifolds are distinct properties. 
 Although Sard's Theorem does not hold in general, every continuous map  from a Hilbert manifold can be arbitrary closely approximated by a smooth map  which has no critical points.

Examples 

 Similarly, any open subset of a Hilbert space is a Hilbert manifold and a Riemannian manifold under the same construction as for the whole space.
 There are several mapping spaces between manifolds which can be viewed as Hilbert spaces by only considering maps of suitable Sobolev class. For example we can consider the space  of all  maps from the unit circle  into a manifold  This can be topologized via the compact open topology as a subspace of the space of all continuous mappings from the circle to  that is, the free loop space of  The Sobolev kind mapping space  described above is homotopy equivalent to the free loop space. This makes it suited to the study of algebraic topology of the free loop space, especially in the field of string topology. We can do an analogous Sobolev construction for the loop space, making it a codimension  Hilbert submanifold of  where  is the dimension of

See also

References

. Contains a general introduction to Hilbert manifolds and many details about the free loop space.
. Another introduction with more differential topology.
N. Kuiper, The homotopy type of the unitary group of Hilbert spaces", Topology 3, 19-30
J. Eells, K. D. Elworthy, "On the differential topology of Hilbert manifolds", Global analysis. Proceedings of Symposia in Pure Mathematics, Volume XV 1970, 41-44.
J. Eells, K. D. Elworthy, "Open embeddings of certain Banach manifolds", Annals of Mathematics 91 (1970), 465-485
D. Chataur, "A Bordism Approach to String Topology", preprint https://arxiv.org/abs/math.at/0306080

External links

 Hilbert manifold at the Manifold Atlas

Differential geometry
General topology
Generalized manifolds
Manifolds
Nonlinear functional analysis
Riemannian geometry
Riemannian manifolds
Structures on manifolds